Veini Kontinen (12 February 1928 – 21 February 2010) was a Finnish cross-country skier. He competed in the men's 50 kilometre event at the 1956 Winter Olympics.

Cross-country skiing results

Olympic Games

References

External links
 

1928 births
2010 deaths
Finnish male cross-country skiers
Olympic cross-country skiers of Finland
Cross-country skiers at the 1956 Winter Olympics
People from Mikkeli
Sportspeople from South Savo
20th-century Finnish people